Jay McNeil (born August 20, 1970) is a former offensive lineman for the Calgary Stampeders, of the Canadian Football League. He played from 1994 until he retired after the 2007 CFL season. He played in four Grey Cups for the Stampeders, winning two.

He was a CFL Western Division All-Star guard in 2001, 2002, 2004, 2005, 2006 and 2007 CFL seasons. He now resides in Calgary with his wife Tara and his son, Cuyler.

In September 2022, he was hired by the Stampeders to be the team's Vice President of Business Operations.

References

1970 births
Living people
Calgary Stampeders players
Canadian football offensive linemen
Kent State Golden Flashes football players
Players of Canadian football from Ontario
Sportspeople from London, Ontario